"Talk Talk" is a 1982 song by the English band Talk Talk. 
The second single from their debut album, The Party's Over (1982), it topped at no. 52 in the United Kingdom upon initial release. A remix of the song was released later in the same year, peaking at no. 23 in the UK and no. 75 in the U.S. Billboard Hot 100 (also entering the Top 40 in the Billboard Mainstream Rock). The single also reached no. 1 in South Africa in 1983.

The song was originally recorded by Talk Talk singer Mark Hollis's previous band, The Reaction, as "Talk Talk Talk Talk", on the Beggars Banquet punk compilation Streets.

Charts

1Remix

Track listing
March 1982 release

 Talk Talk – 2:58
 ? – 4:02

October 1982 release

 Talk Talk (remix) – 3:23
 Mirror Man – 3:21

References

1977 songs
1982 singles
Music videos directed by Russell Mulcahy
Number-one singles in South Africa
Song recordings produced by Colin Thurston
Songs written by Mark Hollis (musician)
Talk Talk songs